Prunella vulgaris, the common self-heal, heal-all, woundwort, heart-of-the-earth, carpenter's herb, brownwort or blue curls, is a herbaceous plant in the mint family Lamiaceae.

Self-heal is edible: the young leaves and stems can be eaten raw in salads; the plant as a whole can be boiled and eaten as a leaf vegetable; and the aerial parts of the plant can be powdered and brewed in a cold infusion to make a beverage.

Description

Excursion Flora of the British Isles. Cambridge University Press. </ref> with creeping, self-rooting, tough, square, reddish stems branching at the leaf axes.

Each leaf has 3-7 veins that shoot off the middle vein to the margin.

The flowers grow from a clublike, somewhat square, whirled cluster; immediately below this club is a pair of stalkless leaves standing out on either side like a collar. The flowers are two-lipped and tubular. The top lip is a purple hood, and the bottom lip is often white; it has three lobes, with the middle lobe being larger and fringed upwardly. Flowers bloom at different times depending on climate and other conditions, but mostly in summer (from June to August in the USA).

Self-heal propagates both by seed and vegetatively by creeping stems that root at the nodes.

Two subspecies of Prunella vulgaris have been identified: var. vulgaris and var. lanceolota. 

HabitatPrunella vulgaris is a perennial herb native in Europe, Asia, Africa, and North America, and is common in most temperate climates. It was introduced to many countries in the 1800s and has become invasive in the Pacific Islands, including Australia, New Zealand, and Hawaii.PIER, 2016. Honolulu, USA: HEAR, University of Hawaii. Pacific Island Ecosystems at Risk In Ireland, it is generally abundant.Scannell, M.P. and Synnott, D.M. 1972 Census Catalogue of the Flora of Ireland. Dublin Stationery Office This herb also grows in Kashmir where it is known as kalyuth. It is boiled in water, which used to wash and bathe in order to relieve muscle pain.

It grows on roadsides, gardens, waste-places, and woodland edges, and usually in basic and neutral soils.

UsesPrunella vulgaris is edible, and can be used in salads, soups, stews, and boiled as a pot herb.

The herb, which is called xia ku cao (夏枯草) in Chinese, is used in traditional Chinese medicine to treat dizziness, red eyes, dry cough, and dermatitis and boils. It is also a main ingredient in several herbal teas in southern China, including commercial beverages such as Wong Lo Kat.

The Nlaka'pamux drink a cold infusion of the whole plant as a common beverage. The plant is traditionally used by some Indigenous cultures to treat various physical ailments.

Phytochemicals
Phytochemicals include betulinic acid, D-camphor, D-fenchone, cyanidin, delphinidin, hyperoside, manganese, lauric acid, oleanolic acid, rosmarinic acid, myristic acid, rutin, linoleic acid, ursolic acid, beta-sitosterol, lupeol, and tannins.

EtymologyPrunella is derived from 'Brunella', a word which is itself a derivative, taken from "", the German name for quinsy (a type of throat inflammation), which Prunella was historically used to cure. Vulgaris'' means 'usual', 'common', or 'vulgar'.

Self-heal and heal-all refer to its uses in traditional medicine.

References

vulgaris
Medicinal plants
Plants used in Native American cuisine
Flora of North America
Plants described in 1753
Taxa named by Carl Linnaeus